Robert, Rob, Robby, Robbie, Bob, or Bobby Benson may refer to:

Arts and entertainment
 Bobby Benson (1922–1983), Nigerian musician
 Robby Benson (born 1956), American actor
 Bob Benson (Mad Men) (fl. 2007–2015), character on the TV series Mad Men played by James Wolk
 Rob Benson (Mickey Finn's T-Rex), British musician, singer for Mickey Finn's T-Rex

Politics and law
 Robert Benson, 1st Baron Bingley (1676–1731), English politician
 Robert Benson (New York) (1739–1823), American politician, clerk of the New York State Senate
 Robert Benson (barrister) (1797–1844), English judge and author
 Robert Benson (Australian politician) (1800–1860), Australian miner and politician in colonial Victoria

Sports
 Bob Benson (Robert William Benson, 1883–1916), English footballer who died during a game
 Robert Benson (ice hockey) (1894–1965), Canadian ice hockey player
 Robbie Benson (born 1992), Irish footballer
 Bob Benson (American football), American football coach

Others
 Robin Benson (Robert Henry Benson, 1850–1929), English merchant banker, art collector and FA Cup winner
 Robert Hugh Benson (1871–1914), British author, Anglican priest, Catholic priest

Other uses
 Bobby Benson and the B-Bar-B Riders, American radio program